This is a list of Australian crime podcasts from 2015 (the earliest podcast) to the present.

Background 
Podcasting, and in particular true-crime related podcasts which deal primarily with serial murders, kidnappings, disappearances, and unsolved crimes, became popular as a media format in Australia starting in 2016. While some podcasts are privately produced, many are created by investigative journalists within media outlets such as The Daily Telegraph, The Australian, ABC, or SBS. Most detail individual cases across a short series of episodes (e.g. Cop Tales at 1 episode) while others (e.g. Australian True Crime) issue individual, or sometimes serial, episodes on different cases weekly.

Most podcasts act to provide background detail on already well known cases (e.g. A Perfect Storm and the Chamberlain case) while also updating cases for recent developments, investigations, or trials (e.g. Claremont: The Trial). Others, particularly with cold cases, make appeals to the public for information (e.g. The Alibi). Some are criticised as potentially complicating, or compromising, ongoing police investigations (e.g. The Teacher's Pet).

Some shows have become well known internationally (e.g. Casefile) and others have gone on to provoke significant breakthroughs (e.g. Trace, which in 2019 prompted the parliament of Victoria to change legislation, which allowed the state coroner to then commence a new inquest into the Maria James murder case). A similar situation occurred with The Lady Vanishes which led to an inquest commencing in New South Wales in 2020. Another podcast, The Nurse, helped trigger a Commission of Inquiry in Tasmania in 2020. In February 2022, revelations from Shandee’s Story prompted the coronial inquest into her disappearance to reopen.

In 2018, The Teacher’s Pet won the Gold Walkley for excellence in Australian journalism. In 2019, Wrong Skin, won in two categories of the annual Australian Podcast Awards: Investigative Journalism & True Crime, and the inaugural Podcast of the Year. In 2020, Birds Eye View was awarded Podcast of the Year and Unravel: Snowball was awarded Best True Crime Podcast. In 2021, The Nurse was awarded Best True Crime Podcast and in 2022, The Greatest Menace won the award.

List

iSee also
List of American crime podcasts

References 

Australian crime podcasts
Investigative journalism
Infotainment
Australian crime-related lists
Lists of podcasts